Paul Baccanello (born 12 June 1979, in Adelaide) is a former Australian professional tennis player. He has sustained various injuries during his career, which have hampered his results.

Career 
Baccanello managed to qualify for the main draw at Wimbledon in 2003. He defeated former top 100 player Ivo Heuberger in the first round, before falling in a tight four set match to Croatian Ivo Karlović in the second round. As a result, he earned a career best prize-money of over $23,000 and rose 37 places in the ATP rankings. In arguably his best performance to date, he did manage to reach the semi-finals of the Challenger event at Segovia in 2003, where he played Rafael Nadal. In a close match, Baccanello took Rafael to a tie-break in the first set, before Nadal took control in the second set, winning 7–6, 6–4. His career high singles ranking of 129 was achieved on 3 November 2003, after other strong performances on the Challenger circuit.

Baccanello currently has a 2–8 ATP record and has earned a total of $261,855 prize money in his career.

Challenger and Futures Finals

Singles: 16 (4–12)

Doubles: 16 (9–7)

Performance timelines

Singles

Doubles

Record against other players

Record against top 10 players
Paul Baccanello's record against players who have been ranked in the top 10, with those who are active in boldface. Only ATP Tour main draw and Davis Cup matches are considered:

Record against players ranked No. 11–20
Active players are in boldface. 

  Nicolas Escudé 0–1
  Feliciano López 0–1
  Ivo Karlović 0–1

References

External links 
 
 
  (archive)

1979 births
Living people
Australian male tennis players
Australian people of Italian descent
Hopman Cup competitors
Tennis players from Adelaide